Amado Cruz (born 17 November 1987) is a Belizean canoeist. In 2019, he competed in the men's K-1 200 metres and men's K-1 1000 metres at the 2019 Pan American Games held in Lima, Peru. He also competed in the men's K-1 200 metres and men's K-1 1000 metres events at the 2020 Summer Olympics held in Tokyo, Japan.

References

External links
 

1987 births
Living people
Belizean male canoeists
Olympic canoeists of Belize
Canoeists at the 2020 Summer Olympics
Place of birth missing (living people)
Pan American Games competitors for Belize
Canoeists at the 2019 Pan American Games